The Llanidloes and Newtown Railway (L&NR) was a railway company between Llanidloes and Newtown in Montgomeryshire, Wales. It was promoted locally when plans for trunk railways passing through the locality were cancelled; local people saw that a railway connection was essential to the flannel industry in the district. The  line opened in 1859, and at first was isolated from any other railway, but from 1861 it became connected to Oswestry by an allied railway company, and other companies also connected to it. From 1864 the company was incorporated into the new Cambrian Railways company.

Serving a thinly populated and remote area, the line was never commercially successful, and the long-distance through routes passing through did not succeed in bringing great traffic volumes to the line. When Llanidloes station was to be extended and improved, the Manchester and Milford Railway (M&MR), then under construction, undertook to pay a one-third share of the cost of the works, and of future maintenance and operation of the station. The M&MR later decided to alter the course of its line and never reached Llanidloes, but continued to be liable for heavy charges for a station it did not connect with.

Major route closures took place in the region in the 1960s, but a portion of the L&NR, from Newtown to Moat Lane, continues in use, carrying passenger trains on the Shrewsbury to Aberystwyth line.

Before the Llanidloes and Newtown Railway

At the end of the eighteenth century, the local industry of Mid Wales was already fairly well provided with canals, although the mountainous terrain made their engineering difficult. After 1830 attention was being given to railway communication with Ireland and a Royal Commission was established in 1836 to enquire into the matter. Charles Blacker Vignoles reported in 1837 on his recommended route to reach Dublin, which was to use a natural harbour at Porthdinllaen on the north coast of the Llŷn Peninsula. Vignoles proposed a railway route to Porthdinllaen from Shrewsbury via Oswestry, Chirk, Bala, Barmouth, Harlech, and Pwllheli, although a route similar to the present Chester – Holyhead route was considered, and rejected.

Isambard Kingdom Brunel was considering a London to Dublin route at the same time, and he too favoured Porthdinllaen as a ferry port. His line would have been  broad gauge and run from Ludlow through Craven Arms, Montgomery and Newtown. However at this stage these schemes were merely proposals and had not achieved traction in gaining financial commitment. In fact George Stephenson, favouring the easier gradients of the Chester to Holyhead line, was persuasive, and when the Chester and Holyhead Railway was authorised on 4 July 1844, any scheme for Porthdinllaen was futile.

In 1852 a further proposal was published, for a Montgomeryshire Railways Company; it would run from Shrewsbury through Minsterley (rather than Welshpool), Newtown, Llanidloes and Llangurig to Aberystwyth. The London and North Western Railway, by now dominant in North Wales, took over the scheme but altered the route avoiding Llanidloes, and in fact the western part of this scheme was dropped before it went before Parliament.

Llanidloes and Newtown Railway proposed

There was considerable disappointment in Llanidloes, that the town was now to be passed by, and much interest was shown in building their own line to Newtown, where a connection would be made with the Montgomeryshire line when it was built. A meeting was held at Llanidloes on 30 October 1852 under the chairmanship of George Hammond Whalley MP. A prospectus was approved: capital of £60,000 would be needed to build the line, and annual receipts were estimated at £8,250, offering a dividend of 7 per cent. The route was surveyed by Rice Hopkins. The bill went forward to the 1853 Parliamentary session. Serious errors in Hopkins’ levels were exposed, but the scheme was quickly rectified and the Act of Parliament was passed on 4 August 1853.

Authorisation and construction

The Llanidloes and Newtown Railway received its authorising Act on 4 August 1853. Commercial prospects seemed excellent; Whalley was elected chairman. The authorisation led to a period of elation within the company, and immediately a long extension line to Shrewsbury was suggested. However, the new company quickly found great difficulty in raising subscriptions to build its own line. It was not until September 1855 that the first construction contract was awarded; that went to David Davies of Llandinam. In time Davies became prominent in construction and mining in Wales. Soon Davies got the contract for the whole line; he took into partnership Thomas Savin of Llwyn-y-maen. 

The original plan was for a double-track line but this was amended to single-track, with bridges built for later doubling.

Some progress was made with construction, but by the end of 1857 all available money had been expended and work stopped, and Davies and Savin were working elsewhere. Early in 1859, Davies and Savin offered to finish the line, in exchange for all unissued shares and debentures, on paper a 25 per cent rise on the original contract value, and to lease and work the line. The chairman was against acceptance, but a committee of shareholders considered that there was no realistic alternative, and voted in favour. The lease was incorporated into the 21 July 1859 Llanidloes and Newtown Railway (Canal Extension) Act. (The proposed canal extension was to be a short tramway to the Shropshire Union Canal basin at Newtown, but it was never built.)
The railway construction was resumed with the excavation of Scafell cutting. The company engineer was now Benjamin Piercy of Trefeglwys, as Rice Hopkins had died.

Opening

The line was finished to a temporary terminus at Newtown, and goods trains started running on 30 April 1859. The company was not in a position to operate passenger trains for some time; the necessary Board of Trade approval was received on 6 or 9 August and passenger train operation started on 2 September 1859. These were the first passenger trains to run in mid-Wales. Intermediate stations were at Dolwen, Llandinam and Caersws, and working of the single line was by timetable. There was no intermediate crossing place.

Four locomotives were ordered from Sharp, Stewart and Company of Manchester to work the  line, and Davies and Savin used other engines for the construction. The first, Dove, reached Llandinam in 1857. It was brought by road from Oswestry on a special road wagon pulled by 14 horses. Dove was probably a second hand Sharp, Roberts 2-2-2 locomotive acquired from the Birmingham and Derby Junction Railway. It was followed by locomotives named Squirrel, Llewellyn and Enterprise. At this stage the L&NR was isolated and all stores were carried by canal to Newtown and carted across the town to the station.

Connecting railways

The isolated state of the L&NR was not to last for long; the Oswestry and Newtown Railway opened on 10 June 1861, connecting the Llanidloes and Newtown Railway to the rest of the railway network via Oswestry and the Great Western Railway. The Newtown and Machynlleth Railway followed, opening on 3 January 1863, running westward from Moat Lane Junction, so that the southern (Llanidloes) end of the L&NR was now a spur branch line. The existing Moat Lane station (Caersws) was closed and replaced by one nearer Newtown, at the junction at Moat Lane. From 14  August 1860 Llandloes and Newtown Railway trains ran through to Abermule, on the Oswestry and Newtown Railway.

Southward connections

Llanidloes was now the southern termination of the lines in the area, but two ambitious schemes to connect to Llanidloes were in hand. On 1 August 1859, the Mid-Wales Railway was authorised by Parliament. This scheme had been radically cut back during the Parliamentary hearings; only a few months previously its promoters called it "the Mid-Wales section of the Manchester, Liverpool, Swansea & Milford Haven Junction Railway," but it was authorised from Llanidloes as far as Newbridge-on-Wye only, passing through Rhayader. The authorised line was not what the Mid-Wales proprietors wanted, and in 1860 they returned to Parliament. This time they were more successful, and another Mid-Wales Railway Act was passed on 3 July 1860. This confirmed the previous year's approval, and extended it to Three Cocks, giving access to Brecon and Merthyr.

Later that month, on 23 July 1860, the Manchester and Milford Railway was authorised to build a line south from Llanidloes through Strata Florida, Tregaron and Lampeter to Pencader. Unnoticed at the time was the fact that the authorised route southward out of Llanidloes was nearly identical for the Mid-Wales Railway and the Manchester and Milford Railway. 

After some argumentation, this difficulty was resolved by the Llanidloes and Newtown Railway undertaking to build the duplicated section of line, granting running powers over the line to both companies, and, it hoped, to build a joint station at Llanidloes. This was authorised by Act of 17 July 1862. The Manchester and Milford Railway constructed its line from the southern extremity, northwards, and the process was slow due to money shortages. The Mid-Wales Railway too was subject to cash problems, but most of its line from Penpontbren to Rhayader was made ready by March 1863, despite the difficult terrain. 

Meanwhile the Llanidloes and Newtown Railway progressed with its Llanidloes to Penpontbren section; this was made with two single lines, the eastern for the Mid-Wales Railway, and the western for the Manchester and Milford Railway. Captain Tyler approved the section for the Board of Trade in January 1864. The Manchester and Milford Railway which was still building far to the south west, but when it should eventually reach Penpontbren a full double junction would have to be made there. Early in 1864 the through station built at Llanidloes in readiness for the opening of the Mid-Wales Railway to Brecon was completed and the L&NR used this station and closed its old terminus to passenger use.

Belatedly the M&MR made a start in building from Penpontbren. In that month, an M&MR goods train reached Llangurig. Most of the Mid-Wales Railway was opened on 23 August 1864. The Mid-Wales Railway and the Manchester and Milford Railway were obliged by the agreement to pay 5% interest on the L&NR construction cost of the line to Penpontbren. Moreover the new station at Llanidloes was to be joint between the three companies, with operating and maintenance cost, as well as interest at 5% on construction cost, shared equally between them.

Holden portrays this from the M&MR's point of view:

In February 1864 the M&MR was reviewing its strategy. The most difficult construction was yet to be made, and Newtown was beginning to appear an unattractive destination. Construction of the M&MR had reached Strata Florida, and the company made the decision to turn west from there, to reach Aberystwyth instead, abandoning the plan to reach Llangurig, and abandoning its  of completed line there. The M&MR was nevertheless committed to pay its one-third of the operating cost and interest charges for the Llanidloes station, even though it now had no intention of reaching Llanidloes. In addition the M&MR had to pay their share of the Penpontbren signalmen’s wages.  The situation was only resolved when the Great Western Railway leased the M&MR in 1911.

The track provided for the M&MR from Llanidloes to Penpontbren was unused for many years, until in July 1872 Penpontbren Junction was commissioned, the section now working as a double line. In 1879 all traffic worked over the down line, for reasons not recorded. The Llangurig branch, as it had become, was lifted in 1882, with a short section of the branch being retained as a siding.

Christiansen has a slightly different account:

Consolidation
This multitude of small independent railway companies in the area was hardly sustainable, and amalgamation was agreed. By an authorising Act in 1864, the Cambrian Railways company was created, formed of the Llanidloes and Newtown Railway, the Oswestry and Newtown Railway, the Newtown and Machynlleth Railway, and the Oswestry, Ellesmere and Whitchurch Railway. The Aberystwith and Welsh Coast Railway joined the consortium just over a year later.

On 25 July 1864 an Act was passed authorising the amalgamation of the L&NR with three more of the five railways forming the main line—the Oswestry & Newtown, Newtown & Machynlleth and the Oswestry, Ellesmere & Whitchurch—to form the Cambrian Railways. A fifth line, the Aberystwith and Welsh Coast Railway, joined the consortium just over a year later.

Decline
The Mid-Wales Railway served a thinly-populated rural area, and its operational costs were increasing at a time when income was declining. When the Mid-Wales line closed, the portion of the Llanidloes and Newtown Railway between Moat Lane Junction and Llanidloes closed too, for all traffic with one exception, on 30 December 1962. This traffic continued until 2 October 1967, when that part of the line closed.

Traction
The original L&NR locomotives were of the 0-4-2 tender type, built by Sharp in 1859–60. Nothing is known of Llewelyn, which was the property of Davies and Savin, but Milford was an 0-4-2 saddle tank built by Sharps in 1859 for them. In Cambrian days, various Cambrian engines were drafted in, and later the GWR Dean Goods was used on the line. Under British Railways, the two- and three-coach passenger trains were worked by ex-LMS 2-6-0s. Occasionally BR standard 2-6-0 engines appeared on trains proceeding only as far as Llanidloes, to which (from Moat Lane) the route classification was “yellow”.

Train service
The original passenger timetable for the line showed four trains each way, weekdays only, taking 35 minutes for the journey. After the line had been opened to Aberystwyth, this was increased to five trains, with two on Sundays. The 1910 timetable showed a service of nine trains a day. There were still nine trains (one of these being a school train) in 1960, with no Sunday service.

Although the trains were well patronised compared with many lines in Mid-Wales, the Western Region of British Railways applied for permission to close the line completely. This was rejected, but the passenger service from Moat Lane to Brecon was withdrawn (together with all freight services south of Llanidloes) from December 31, 1962.

The section between Newtown and Moat Lane Junction remains in use as part of the Shrewsbury to Aberystwyth line. Although Newtown station remains open, this was not part of the L&NR system, but was on the Oswestry and Newtown Railway.

Locations

 Newtown; opened 11 August 1859; replaced by new station near centre of town on through Oswestry and Newtown line 10 June 1861 when the O&NR was opened; still open;
 Scafell; opened by May 1863; closed 1 July 1891; reopened as Scafell Halt 9 June 1913, for eastbound trains only; the line had been doubled and no westbound platform was provided; closed in 1952 or 7 March 1955.
 Moat Lane; second station; opened 5 January 1863; renamed Moat Lane Junction 1904; closed 31 December 1962; many sources use the name Moat Lane, but Chirstiansen and Miller call it Caersws;
 Moat Lane; first station; opened 11 August 1859; closed 5 January 1863;
 Llandinam; opened 11 August 1859; closed 31 December 1962; 
 Dolwen; opened 11 August 1859; became halt in 1957; closed 31 December 1962;
 Llanidloes; opened 11 August 1859; relocated a short distance southwest by January 1862, when the line was extended to a joint station; closed 31 December 1962;
 Penpontbren Junction; end-on junction with Mid-Wales Railway, former junction with Llangurig branch.

Gradients
The line is undulating from Newtown to the approach to Moat Lane Junction.

Notes

References

Cambrian Railways
Pre-grouping British railway companies
Standard gauge railways in Wales